Shish Boom Bam is the first album by the Rustic Overtones, released in 1994.

Track listing
 "Head First"
 "Three O'Clock"
 "Brand New Friend"
 "Bad Truth"
 "88"
 "Fine"
 "Ride"
 "Fishin' in a Bucket"
 "Colostomy"
 "Freddie Had a Lady"
 "One Strongest Will"
 "Scarecrow"
 "Juice"

1994 debut albums
Rustic Overtones albums